Thrasyllus is a monotypic genus of phasmids belonging to the family Lonchodidae. The only species is Thrasyllus macilentus.

The species is found in Philippines.

References

Lonchodidae